Samuel James McQueen (born 6 February 1995) is an English former professional footballer. Other than loan periods at Southend United in 2016 and Middlesbrough in 2018, he spent his career at hometown club Southampton, having joined the club's academy at the age of eight. He played primarily as a left-sided full-back or winger.

McQueen was forced to retire at the age of 26 in 2022 after failing to recover from a knee injury experienced while on loan at Middlesbrough. McQueen initially ruptured the ACL in his right knee but experienced a series of setbacks culminating in his retirement.

Early life
McQueen was born in Southampton and attended The Mountbatten School in Romsey, Hampshire. Southampton scouted him when he was eight years old whilst playing for Oakwood Rangers, a local youth side. He was part of the Southampton F.C. Academy U13 side that were runners-up in the prestigious Dr Pepper Dallas Cup Tournament in Texas where they lost 1–0 to FC Barcelona California in 2008. The same team included other academy products James Ward-Prowse, Luke Shaw, Calum Chambers, Harrison Reed, Jordan Turnbull, Jake Sinclair and Dominic Gape all who gained professional contracts in later years with the club.

Club career
McQueen was named in the Southampton senior team for the first time on 15 February 2014 for the FA Cup fifth round match against Sunderland at the Stadium of Light; he came on in the second half for his debut, playing the last eight minutes of the 0–1 defeat, in place of Adam Lallana. McQueen signed a new four-year contract on 17 June 2014.

In January 2016, McQueen completed a loan move to League One side Southend United until the end of the season. He made his league debut in the 3–0 home win over Coventry City, coming on as a substitute in the 86th minute. He scored his first league goal as a professional 11 days later in his first full league start in the Essex derby against Colchester United on his 21st birthday.

He made his Premier League debut for Southampton on 16 October 2016, when he replaced Matt Targett at left-back after 14 minutes of a 3–1 win over Burnley, winning a penalty for the third goal. Four days later, he made his 2016–17 UEFA Europa League debut and first senior start for the Saints on 20 October  versus Inter Milan at the San Siro. This was followed three days later by his first league start for them in a 1–1 away draw with Manchester City.

On 5 December 2016, McQueen signed a new long-term contract with Southampton, penning a deal until 2021.

On 30 August 2018, McQueen signed for Middlesbrough on a season-long loan. In October 2018, he suffered a serious knee injury in a game against Crystal Palace. McQueen's recovery was disrupted by recurring infections of his knee construction, which required additional surgeries. In April 2021, Southampton manager Ralph Hasenhüttl said it would be a "miracle" if McQueen played again. McQueen retired from professional football as a result of his injuries on 1 January 2022.

International career
McQueen received his first call-up for the England under-21 side as a squad member for a pair of friendly matches against Germany and Denmark in March 2017. McQueen was an unused substitute in the Germany match but was handed his debut on 27 March, starting at left-back in the game against Denmark. Aidy Boothroyd, the manager, was quoted as saying "Sam McQueen was excellent" in the 4–0 victory against Denmark.

Career statistics

Honours
Southampton U21
U21 Premier League Cup: 2014–15

Southampton
EFL Cup runner-up: 2016–17

References

External links

England profile at The FA

1995 births
Living people
Footballers from Southampton
Association football midfielders
English footballers
Premier League players
English Football League players
Southampton F.C. players
Southend United F.C. players
Middlesbrough F.C. players
England under-21 international footballers